Midland is a city in and the county seat of Midland County, Texas, United States. A small part of Midland is in Martin County.

At the 2020 census, Midland's population was 132,524. It is the principal city of the Midland, Texas metropolitan statistical area, which includes all of Midland County, the population of which grew 4.6% between July 1, 2011, and July 1, 2012, to 151,662, according to the U.S. Census Bureau. The metropolitan area is part of the larger Midland–Odessa combined statistical area, which had a population of 340,391 in the 2020 census. Residents of Midland are referred to as 'Midlanders'.

Located in the Permian Basin in West Texas, Midland is a major center for oil and natural gas production. Midland was founded as the midway point between Fort Worth and El Paso on the Texas and Pacific Railroad in 1881. The city has many connections to the Bush family; It was the onetime home of former Presidents George H. W. Bush and George W. Bush and the hometown of former First Lady Laura Bush. The George W. Bush Childhood Home is located in Midland.

History 

Midland was established in June 1881 as Midway Station, on the Texas and Pacific Railway. Its name came from its central location between Fort Worth and El Paso, but because there were already other towns in Texas named Midway, the city changed its name to Midland in January 1884 when it was granted its first post office.

Midland became the county seat of Midland County in March 1885, when that county was first organized and separated from Tom Green County. By 1890, it had become one of the state's most important cattle shipping centers. The city was incorporated in 1906, and by 1910 established its first fire department, along with a new water system.

Midland was changed significantly by the discovery of oil in the Permian Basin in 1923 when the Santa Rita No. 1 well began producing in Reagan County, followed shortly by the Yates Oil Field in Iraan. Midland became the West Texas oil fields' administrative center. During World War II, it had the nation's largest bombardier training base. A second boom began after the war, with the discovery and development of the Spraberry Trend, still the country's third-largest oil field by total reserves. Yet another boom period took place during the 1970s, with the high oil prices associated with the oil and energy crises. Today, the Permian Basin produces one fifth of the nation's total petroleum and natural gas output.

Midland's economy still relies heavily on petroleum, but the city has also become a regional telecommunications and distribution center. By August 2006, a busy period of crude oil production had caused a significant workforce deficit. According to the Midland Chamber of Commerce, at that time there were almost 2,000 more jobs available in the Permian Basin than there were workers to fill them.

In 1959, John Howard Griffin wrote a history of Midland, Land of the High Sky.

Avery v. Midland County 
In 1967, the U.S. Supreme Court heard the case Avery v. Midland County. Midland mayor Hank Avery had sued Midland County, challenging the electoral-districting scheme in effect for elections to the County Commissioner's Court. The county districts geographically quartered the county, but Midland, in the northwestern quarter, had 97% of the county's population. A judge, elected on an at-large basis, provided a fifth vote, but the result was that the three rural commissioners, representing only 3% of the county's population, held a majority of the votes.

The Court held that the scheme violated the Fourteenth Amendment's Equal Protection clause. A dissenting minority held that this example of the Warren Court's policy of incorporation at the local-government level exceeded its constitutional authority.

Geography 
Midland is in the Permian Basin in West Texas plains.

According to the United States Census Bureau, the city has an area of 71.5 square miles (185.2 km), of which 71.3 square miles (184.7 km) is land and 0.2 square mile (0.5 km) (0.28%) is water.

Climate 
Midland has a semi-arid climate (Köppen BSh or BSk) with hot summers and cool to mild winters. It occasionally has cold waves during the winter, but rarely sees extended periods of below-freezing cold.

Notes

Cityscape 

Nicknamed "The Tall City", Midland has long been known for its downtown skyline. Most of downtown Midland's major office buildings were built during a time of major Permian Basin oil and gas discoveries. The surge in energy prices in the mid-1980s sparked a building boom downtown. For many years, the 22-story Wilco Building in downtown was the tallest building between Fort Worth and Phoenix.

The great oil bust of the mid-1980s killed any plans for future skyscrapers. A private development group was planning to build Energy Tower at City Center, which was proposed to be 870 feet tall, with 59 floors (six floors underground and 53 above). If it had been built, it would have been Texas's sixth-tallest building.

Demographics 

As of the 2020 United States census, there were 132,524 people, 47,682 households, and 32,632 families residing in the city. The population density was 1,558.9 people per square mile (550.6/km). There were 47,562 housing units at an average density of 667.1 per square mile (231.0/km). Of the 47,682 households, 37.9% had children under the age of 18 living with them, 55.4% were opposite-sex married couples living together, 11.9% had a female householder with no husband present, and 29.3% were made up of same-sex relationships, non-family habitations, or other habitation arrangements. About 25.8% of all households were made up of individuals, and 9.2% had someone living alone who was 65 years of age or older. The average household size was 2.62 and the average family size was 3.19.

In the city, the population was distributed as 29.9% under the age of 18, 9.0% from 18 to 24, 28.2% from 25 to 44, 20.6% from 45 to 64, and 12.3% who were 65 years of age or older. The median age was 34 years. For every 100 females, there were 92.2 males. For every 100 females age 18 and over, there were 87.7 males.

In 2000, the median income for a household in the city was $39,320, and for a family was $48,290. Males had a median income of $37,566 versus $24,794 for females. The per capita income for the city in 2007 was $52,294. In 2000, about 10.1% of families and 12.9% of the population were below the poverty line, including 16.4% of those under age 18 and 8.0% of those age 65 or over.

In 2014, Forbes magazine ranked Midland the second fastest-growing small city in the United States.

Economy 
In 2014, Midland had the lowest unemployment rate in the United States, 2.3%. According to the city's latest Comprehensive Annual Financial Report, the city's top ten employers are:

Arts and culture

Galleries 
Midland College is home to the McCormick Gallery, inside the Allison Fine Arts Building on the main campus. Throughout the year, exhibits at the McCormick feature works of MC students and faculty, visiting artists, and juried exhibits. The Arts Council of Midland serves as the promotional and public relations vehicle to promote the arts and stimulate community participation and support. The McCormick is also home to the Studio 3600 Series, established in 2006 to "spotlight selected art students and provide them the opportunity to exhibit key works that identify the style they have crafted over a period of time."

Performing arts 

The Midland-Odessa Symphony and Chorale (MOSC) has performed in the Permian Basin for over 45 years, and is the region's largest orchestral organization, presenting both Pops and Masterworks concerts throughout the year. The MOSC also is home to three resident chamber ensembles, the Lone Star Brass, Permian Basin String Quartet and West Texas Winds. These ensembles are made up of principal musicians in the orchestra.

The Midland Community Theatre (MCT) originated in 1946 with musicals, comedies, dramas, mysteries, children's theatre and melodramas. MCT produces 15 shows each year in three performance spaces—Davis Theatre I and Mabee Theatre II, in the Cole Theatre, and the annual fundraiser Summer Mummers in the Yucca Theatre. MCT is a member of the American Association of Community Theatre, and hosted the 2006 AACT International Theatrefest.

Twice each year, the Phyllis and Bob Cowan Performing Arts Series at Midland College presents free cultural and artistic performances. The series was endowed in 1999.

Libraries 
 Midland County Library
 Haley Memorial Library and History Center
 Murray L. Fasken Learning Resource Center at Midland College

Tourism 

Sitting on the southern edge of the Llano Estacado and near the center of the Permian Basin oil fields, Midland's economy has long been focused on petroleum exploration and extraction. Providing more information about this industry is the Permian Basin Petroleum Museum, on the outskirts of town near Interstate 20. The museum houses numerous displays on the history, science, and technology of oil and gas development. The Permian Basin Petroleum Museum houses a collection of race cars designed by Jim Hall, a longtime Midland resident who pioneered the use of aerodynamic downforce in Formula One car design.

Midland is also home to The Museum of the Southwest. The museum features a collection of paintings by various members of the Taos Society of Artists and Karl Bodmer as well as engravings by John J. and John W. Audubon. Within the same museum complex are the Children's Museum and the Marian W. Blakemore Planetarium. The Museum of the Southwest is in the Turner Mansion, the historic 1934 home of Fred and Juliette Turner.

On display at the Midland County Historical Museum are reproductions of the "Midland Man", the skeleton of a Clovis female found near the city in 1953. Analysis of the remains by Curtis R. McKinney using uranium-thorium analysis showed that the bones are 11,600 ± 800 years old. Presenting his findings at the annual meeting of the Geological Society of America in 1992, McKinney said, "[T]he Midland Woman was related to the earliest ancestors of every Indian who lives today, and she is very likely the only representative of those who created the Clovis cultures."

Sports 
Midland is home to the Midland RockHounds, a Texas League minor league baseball team. It is the AA affiliate of the Oakland Athletics. The Rockhounds have played their home games in Momentum Bank Ballpark since 2002.

West Texas United Sockers is an American soccer team founded in 2008. The team is a member of the United Soccer Leagues Premier Development League (PDL), the fourth tier of the American Soccer Pyramid, in the Mid South Division of the Southern Conference. The team plays its home games at the Grande Communications Stadium.

Midland is home to the West Texas Drillers (Adult Tackle Football) of the Minor Professional Football League. They were established in 2009. They play their home games at Grande Communications Stadium.

Midland College is a member of the Western Junior College Athletic Conference, and fields teams in baseball, men's basketball, women's basketball, men's golf, softball and volleyball. Midland College has won 20 national championships in sports since 1975, as well as produced 192 All-Americans.

Plans have been made to develop a 35-court tennis facility named the Bush Tennis Center.

Midland is also home to the Midland Mad Dog Rugby Club, which competes in the Texas Rugby Union as a Division III team.

Government

Local government 

According to its 2008 Comprehensive Annual Financial Report, Midland's various funds had $57.3 million in revenues, $53.0 million in expenditures, $363.4 million in total assets, $133.9 million in total liabilities, and $75.0 million in cash and investments.

 1907–1908, S.J. Issaacs
 1908–1909, A.C. Parker
 1909–1911, J.A. Haley
 1911–1915, J.M. Cladwell
 1915–1917, J.M. Gilmore
 1917–1918, H.A. Leaverton
 1918–1923, W.A. Dawson
 1923–1925, Paul T. Barron
 1925–1929, Frank Haag
 1929–1934, Leon Goodman
 1934–1943, M.C. Ulmer
 1943–1946, A.N. Hendrickson
 1946–1947, Fred Hogan
 1947–1949, Russell H. Gifford
 1949–1951, William B. Neely
 1951–1953, Perry Pickett
 1953–1954, J.W. McMillen
 1955–1958, Ernest Sidwell
 1958–1962, F.L. Thompson
 1962–1968, H. C. Avery, Jr.
 1968–1972, Edwin H. Magruder Jr.
 1972–1980, Ernest Angelo Jr.
 1980–1986, G. Thane Akins
 1986–1992, Carroll Thomas
 1992–1994, J.D. Faircloth
 1994–2001, Robt. E. Burns
 2001–2008, Michael J. Canon
 2008–2014, Wes Perry
 2014–2019, Jerry Morales

State and federal representation 
Midland is represented in the US Senate by John Cornyn and Ted Cruz and in the US House of Representatives by August Pfluger. Midland residents are represented in the Texas Senate by Republican Kel Seliger, District 31. Midland is represented in the Texas House of Representatives by Republican Tom Craddick, the former Speaker from District 82.

The Texas Department of Criminal Justice operates the headquarters of Parole Division Region V in Midland; the Midland District Parole Office is in the Region V headquarters.

The United States Postal Service operates the Midland Main Post Office on the grounds of Midland International Air and Space Port. The other four post offices are Claydesta, Downtown Midland, Graves, and Village.

Education

Colleges and universities 
Midland is the home of Midland College (MC), which offers over 50 programs of study for associate degrees and certificates to more than 6,000 students who enroll each semester. MC offers programs in health sciences, information technology, and aviation, including a professional pilot training program. MC is one of only three community colleges in Texas approved to offer a bachelor's degree in applied technology. Steve Thomas is MC's president.

Midland is home to the Texas Tech University Health Sciences Center Permian Basin Campus's physician assistant program, on the MC campus. The entry-level graduate program awards a Master of Physician Assistant Studies following 27 months of intensive academic and clinical training.

Visiting lectures 
Twice each year, the Davidson Distinguished Lectures Series at Midland College presents free public lectures by "nationally known speakers whose academic accomplishments, civic leadership, and/or public achievements interest, enrich, and enlighten Midland students and citizens." The series was endowed in 1996, and has brought a diverse selection of speakers to Midland, including Ken Burns, Richard Leakey, Bill Moyers, Mark Russell, Sandra Day O'Connor, Richard Rodriguez, Shelby Foote, Anna Deavere Smith, Bill Nye, John Updike and Neil deGrasse Tyson.

Primary and secondary schools 
Midland Independent School District serves the portion in Midland County, as in the vast majority of Midland. Midland is home to three public high schools: Midland High School, Legacy High School and Early College High School (ECHS) at Midland College, all of which are part of MISD. Another school district just outside Midland, Greenwood Independent School District, serves approximately 3,000 students and operates Greenwood High School, James R. Brooks Middle School, Greenwood Intermediate, and Greenwood Elementary.

In July 2020 the Midland Independent School District voted to change the name of the former Robert E. Lee High School to Legacy High School in the wake of the George Floyd protests.

ECHS welcomed its first freshman class on August 24, 2009. It aims to award students their associate degrees from Midland College by the time they receive their high school diplomas.

The portion in Martin County is in the Stanton Independent School District.

Midland has many private schools, including Hillcrest School, Hillander, Midland Classical Academy, Midland Christian School, Midland Montessori, St. Ann's School, and Trinity School of Midland. It is also home to three charter schools: Richard Milburn Academy, Premier High School, and Midland Academy Charter School.

Media

Newspapers 
Midland is served by the Midland Reporter-Telegram.

Radio

Television 
Midland is served by nine local television stations: KMID, an ABC affiliate; KWES-TV, an NBC affiliate; KOSA, a CBS affiliate and a MyNetworkTV affiliate on their digital cable TV station; KPEJ-TV, a Fox affiliate; KPBT-TV, a PBS affiliate; KWWT, a MeTV affiliate; KUPB, a Univision affiliate; and KTLE-LD, a Telemundo affiliate. It also has a religious television station: KMLM-DT, an affiliate of God's Learning Channel, a worldwide institution offering pro-Israel programming.

Many major motion pictures have been filmed in and around Midland, including Hangar 18, Waltz Across Texas, Fandango, Blood Simple, Hard Country, Friday Night Lights, The Rookie, The Three Burials of Melquiades Estrada, Everybody's Baby: The Rescue of Jessica McClure (which featured, as extras, many participants in the actual rescue and its coverage), and others.

The Midland-Odessa area is a focal point for many of the TV series Heroes's first-season episodes, serving as the Bennet family home and as the location of the Burnt Toast Diner.

Infrastructure

Transportation

Air 
 Midland is served by Midland International Air and Space Port (ICAO code: KMAF, IATA code: MAF), which is located between Odessa and Midland.
 Midland Airpark (ICAO code: KMDD, IATA code: MDD) is a general aviation airport located on Midland's northeast side.

Highways and Roads

Rail 

Midland was the site of the 2012 Midland train crash, in which a train collided with a parade float carrying wounded military veterans, killing four.

Midland also has citywide public bus services provided for the Midland-Odessa Urban Transit District by Midland-Odessa Transit Management, otherwise known as E-Z Rider.

Notable people

Sister cities 
Midland has four sister cities around the world.
  Chihuahua, Chihuahua (Mexico)
  Dongying, Shandong (China), located near China's second-largest known oil field. A modest pagoda, located at the Beal Complex, was donated by Dongying officials.
  New Amsterdam (Guyana)
  Birkenhead (United Kingdom)

References

Bibliography

External links 

 City of Midland, Texas
 

 
Cities in Texas
County seats in Texas
Populated places established in 1881
Cities in Midland County, Texas
Cities in Martin County, Texas
1881 establishments in Texas
Cities in Midland–Odessa